The Bahagian Agama dan Kaunseling (Religious And Counselling Division), or BAKA is the Muslim chaplain service of the Royal Malaysian Police.

External links 
  Royal Malaysian Police website 

Royal Malaysia Police